EPRC may refer to:

 Economic Policy Research Center at Makerere University, Uganda
 Electrical Power Research Centre at DIT School of Electrical & Electronic Engineering, Ireland
 Emory University Prevention Research Center at Emory University, United States
 Endangered Primate Rescue Center, Vietnam 
 Energy and Power Research Council, department of Ministry of Power, Energy and Mineral Resources, Bangladesh 
 Escola Portuguesa Ruy Cinatti, international school in East Timor
 European Personnel Recovery Centre

See also
 European Professional Club Rugby